is a 2010 fighting game produced by Capcom. It is an updated version of Street Fighter IV and has been said to mark the definitive end of the Street Fighter IV series. Having been deemed too large an update to be deployed as DLC, the game was made into a standalone title but given a lower price than that of a full retail game. It was released in April 2010 for the PlayStation 3 and Xbox 360. Super Street Fighter IV: 3D Edition was released as one of the launch titles for the Nintendo 3DS, with 3D functionality, on February 26, 2011, in Japan. The game has sold 1.9 million units worldwide, while the 3D Edition for the 3DS has sold an additional 1.1 million units worldwide.

Gameplay

Much like Street Fighter IV, Super Street Fighter IV features 3D backgrounds and characters played on a 2D plane. Exclusive additions like Focus- Attacks and separate meters for both Super and Ultra Combos make a return. The Ultra Combo gauge and moves has been left unchanged since Street Fighter IV. All characters feature at least two Ultra Combos. However, only one Ultra can be selected at a time in a way similar to the Super Arts system in the Street Fighter III series. To Use a Super Combo or an Ultra Combo, the respective meters have to be full. The Ultra combo meter charges up when the player gets hit and so it can also be called a Revenge Meter. The Ultra Combo meter is the one right next to the Super Combo meter.

The goal is to exhaust the opponent's health meter before the time runs out. The player wins a round if they deplete their opponent's health meter, or have more health than their opponent when time runs out. If both players deplete their meters at the same time or contain the same amount when the round timer ends, it will result in either a "Double KO" or a draw giving both players a round win. If there isn't a clear winner by the final match, it will result in a "draw game" (during online play, both players will lose battle points, and player points, in the result of a draw game).

Similar to past entries, Super Street Fighter IV is played using an eight-way directional system giving players the ability to jump, crouch, and move towards and away from opponents. Generally, there are six attack buttons for both punch and kick commands with three of each type, differing in strength and speed. Similar to the latter two games from the Street Fighter III series, grabs are performed by pressing both light attacks, while taunts are performed by pressing both heavy attacks simultaneously.

When playing through the single-player mode, if toggled on, there are additional bonus stages allowing a chance to receive additional points, similar to the ones found in Street Fighter II. The first challenge involves destroying a car while the second has players break as many barrels as they can.

Super Street Fighter IV features modes from the original game including "Arcade", "Versus", "Training", and "Trials". The game features a few additional online modes apart from Ranked battles. "Team Battle" can have up to 4 players per team to battle against another group. "Endless Battle" has the winner playing against a rotating group of up to 8 players. To replace Street Fighter IV's "Championship Mode", "Tournament" allows players compete in a small single elimination bracket. "Replay Channel" allows players to view and save replays from various matches around the world.

Characters

"Super Street Fighter IV" includes all the original 25 World Warriors from the home version of "Street Fighter IV", as well as 10 new fighters, all of which are unlocked at the start of the game; this means that there a total of 35 characters in "Super Street Fighter IV". Each returning character received a new intro and ending in arcade mode.

Among the added World Warriors are Dee Jay and T. Hawk from Super Street Fighter II, who were initially intended for the original Street Fighter IV but later dropped. Adon from the original Street Fighter and Cody and Guy from Final Fight are available, based on their incarnations in the Street Fighter Alpha series. Additionally, Dudley, Ibuki, and Makoto return from the Street Fighter III series.

The game also introduced two all-new fighters. One of them is Juri, a young South Korean female Taekwondo fighter, who works for Seth's organization, the Shadaloo Intimidation Network (S.I.N.). Juri has an energy-boosting device implanted inside her left eye called the "Feng Shui Engine", which provides her with time-warping abilities. The second fighter, Hakan, is a Turkish oil wrestler who seeks to prove that Turkish oil wrestling is the greatest fighting style on Earth.

Each returning character from the original version of Street Fighter IV features an additional third costume, whereas newly introduced characters have only 2 available. Old costumes from the original Street Fighter IV can be used after purchasing downloadable costume packs from Xbox Live or PlayStation Network. These costumes are automatically loaded in Super Street Fighter IV.

Development
Capcom officially hinted at the game in early September 2009 when they opened a teaser site in their official Japanese website. An official announcement was made on September 28, 2009, for the Xbox 360 and PlayStation 3, with an arcade version initially only considered a possibility depending on fan support.

In 2010 Yoshinori Ono said: "I have no intention of carrying on Street Fighter IV into Hyper Street Fighter IV or Ultra Street Fighter IV, because I'm aware of the mistakes Capcom has made in the past. So whether it would be a different IP or another Street Fighter, we'd like to keep options open. But in terms of Street Fighter IV, this is definitive... Super Street Fighter IV should be the distinctive end. Obviously there can be updates via DLC so perhaps in 2011, we could upload a patch for Super Street Fighter IV 2011 edition that would have tuning and balancing. But as a packaged product, I think this is the last."

Versions

Arcade version

On April 4, 2010, an arcade version of Super Street Fighter IV was confirmed by producer Yoshinori Ono during the Japanese Street Fighter IV finals. Various playtests were handled in various arcades as well as appearing during the Street Fighter IV finals at Tougeki - Super Battle Opera.

For the arcade version of the game, every character received various tweaks, ranging from character balancing to new EX moves.

The arcade version of SSFIV added twin brothers Yun and Yang from the Street Fighter III series as playable characters, and introduced Evil Ryu and Oni as hidden bosses. During the launch of the arcade version, a launch trailer was uploaded teasing secret characters Evil Ryu and Oni. Various arcades around the United States who obtained Arcade Edition units also were since able to gain access to the initially non-selectable, then unannounced characters planned for a later release. Videos featuring Evil Ryu and Oni were requested to be closed as well as accounts suspended at the request of Capcom. Evil Ryu became officially playable on March 25, 2011, while Oni was released on April 8, 2011.

As with the previous version, the arcade version of Super Street Fighter IV Arcade Edition utilizes an NESYS Card system which allows players to keep and track their BP and PP statistics. The pre-match screen will now show a national rank and a prefectural rank as well as an introduction message up to 30 characters long.

The arcade version of the game would be later ported to home platforms in the form of Super Street Fighter IV: Arcade Edition, offered as both a retail game, and as an update to Super Street Fighter IV.

Nintendo 3DS adaptation

At E3 2010, Super Street Fighter IV 3D Edition was announced for the Nintendo 3DS. It takes advantage of its features such as autostereoscopic 3D and improved wireless features, such as Wi-Fi. In an interview with Famitsu, Yoshinori Ono stated that the gameplay would be the same as Super Street Fighter IV. Ono hoped that they can put all the gameplay modes from the console release on the game, plus original content, and they were looking to the possibility of including arranged costumes. Famitsu stated that all the 35 console characters, plus all the systems, would be on the 3DS release. The game has been called "exactly the same" as its HD counterparts by Capcom. The game features two control schemes, Lite and Pro. Lite mode allows players to set up to four hotkeys for moves and combos on the touchscreen, with each character having a custom loadout. For Pro players, combos have to be performed manually, but hotkeys can still be assigned to certain commands to compensate for the 3DS's control layout.

The game can be played either in the traditional 2D viewpoint, or in an optional over the shoulder 3D view.  Also announced was the ability to swap "trophies" using "StreetPass" and the ability to launch into battles when in proximity of another Street Fighter IV player. The game will also feature Download Play, allowing two local players who have downloaded the game from another player to play against each other without a copy of the game (though these players are restricted to only one stage and Ryu).

Updates

Downloadable content
In Asia, a voucher for a downloadable Super Street Fighter IV OVA featuring Juri was supplied in the Collector's Edition of the Xbox 360 version. The 40-minute feature serves as an origin story to Juri and a canonical precursor to the game. Although having been fully dubbed in English, the movie was not released outside of Asia until its inclusion as part of the Street Fighter 25th Anniversary Collector's Set in 2012.

Owners of the original Street Fighter IV costume DLC packs are able to access their previously purchased DLC packs in the new game, as well as having two extra colors unlocked which are only available upon detecting a save from that game. A downloadable Tournament Mode was released on June 15, 2010. As with its previous incarnation, Super Street Fighter IV offers optional alternate costumes for each of the characters through paid DLC. Sold in packs, the first bundle was made available on April 27, 2010. Between October 27, 2010, and early 2011, players can purchase another set of optional alternate costumes through paid DLC packs.

Arcade Edition

Released in July 2012, Super Street Fighter IV: Arcade Edition is an update that brings the changes in the arcade version of Super Street Fighter IV to the home systems.

The update, available as downloadable content in the console versions, and a retail game for Xbox 360, PlayStation 3 and Microsoft Windows, includes several balance changes, as well adding Yun, Yang, Oni and Evil Ryu as playable characters.

Ultra Street Fighter IV

A new update for Street Fighter IV titled Ultra Street Fighter IV was announced in July 2013. The new edition was released on June 4, 2014, as an arcade machine, a DLC add-on for existing console versions of Super Street Fighter IV, and as a stand-alone game containing DLC from previous iterations. Along with various gameplay tweaks and additional modes, the update adds six additional stages and five additional characters: Rolento, Elena, Poison and Hugo (all ported from their Street Fighter x Tekken appearances), as well as an all-new character, Decapre.

Reception

IGN gave the Super Street Fighter IV a 9.0 and an Editor's Choice award, calling it "a superior version of one of the best fighting games around... with a far more developed online mode compared to the original version". GameTrailers gave the game 9.3, praising it for its improvements over the original.
Giant Bomb's Jeff Gerstmann gave the game 5/5 saying "Super Street Fighter IV adds enough great new content to justify skipping over the 'Champion Edition' and 'Hyper Fighting' steps in the Street Fighter upgrade path." GameSpot gave the game a 9.0, commenting that "Super Street Fighter IV stands tall on the broad shoulders of its predecessor. Its large and diverse character roster, balance tweaks, and comprehensive online play reaffirm its place as one of the best fighters this generation, and it's a worthy upgrade even if you own last year's version" In 2011, Complex ranked it as the 40th best fighting game of all time. In 2019, Game Informer ranked it as the 10th best fighting game of all time.

Computer and Video Games gave the 3DS Edition a score of 9.0, praising its appeal to both hardcore and casual gamers, as well as having as much content as its console counterpart. Kotaku also praised the port, saying "if you are going to buy one 3DS game, get this."

In their October 2013 issue, Edge retroactively awarded the game a coveted ten out of ten, one of only twenty-three games to achieve that perfect score in the magazine's twenty-year history.

References

External links

 
Official blog 

2010 video games
D.I.C.E. Award for Fighting Game of the Year winners
Dimps games
Fighting games used at the Evolution Championship Series tournament
Fighting games used at the Super Battle Opera tournament
Multiplayer and single-player video games
PlayStation 3 games
Street Fighter games
Video game sequels
Video games about ninja
Video games developed in Japan
Video games scored by Hideyuki Fukasawa
Video games with 2.5D graphics
Video games with cel-shaded animation
Xbox 360 games